The Democratic Center Party was a small centre political party in Latvia which was founded in September 1992. It took part in the 1993 parliamentary elections, obtaining 5 from 100 seats in the parliament, and in the 1994 local elections, obtaining seats in Riga, Jelgava and Jurmala. Leaders: Ints Cālītis, Aivars Kreituss, Juris Celmiņš, Māris Pūķis. Renamed into Latvian Democratic Party in August 1993, merged with "Saimnieks" to form Democratic Party "Saimnieks" in April 1995.

References

Centrist parties in Latvia
Defunct political parties in Latvia